Salesópolis is a municipality in the state of São Paulo in Brazil. It is part of the Metropolitan Region of São Paulo. The population is 17,252 (2020 est.) in an area of 424.997 km². It is noted for being the source of the Tietê River.

Salesópolis was founded in the 19th century as São José do Paraitinga, and later became the parish of Santana de Mogi das Cruzes in 1838. The parish was elevated to municipality status on March 24, 1857, but renamed Salesópolis in 1905 after a visit of the president of Brazil, Campos Sales (1841-1913).

The Tietê River flows in the northern part of the municipality, and much of the southern part of the municipality is mountainous, heavily forested, and inaccessible. The Atlantic Forest (Mata Atlântica) of Salesópolis were largely destroyed in the late 19th and early 20th century, but 96 ha of the municipality are now protected as part  of the Boracéia Biological Station, a unit of the Museum of Zoology of the University of São Paulo established in 1954. Salesópolis is home to the Buchenavia rabelloana, a species of plant in the Combretaceae family. The species is listed as endangered on the IUCN Red List of Threatened Species.

Population history

References

External links
  Official website
  citybrazil.com.br

Municipalities in São Paulo (state)